The 87th Infantry Division (87. Infanterie-Division) was a formation of the Imperial German Army in World War I. The division was formed in February 1915 as the provisional Dickhuth Corps (Korps Dickhuth), named after its commander, and became the 87th Infantry Division in August 1915. The division was disbanded in 1919 during the demobilization of the German Army after World War I.

Combat chronicle

The 87th Infantry Division initially served on the Eastern Front, fighting on the Polish frontier and in the Gorlice-Tarnów Offensive. It fought in the battle of Lake Njemen and the battle of Vilnius in September 1915. From October 1915 to September 1917, the division occupied the line between Lake Narač and Lake Drūkšiai. In November/December 1917, it occupied the line near Daugavpils. After the armistice on the Eastern Front, the division remained stationary on the armistice line until February and March 1918, when it was involved in fighting in the Baltic region. At the end of March 1918, the division was transferred to the Western Front, where it entered the line in the Champagne region. It later fought against the Allied counterattacks in the Second Battle of the Marne. The division remained on various parts of the front until the end of the war. Allied intelligence rated the division as fourth class.

Order of battle on formation

On 11 November 1914, Korps Dickhuth (Thorn) consisted of

99. Reserve Infantry Brigade des XXV Reserve Korps
21 Landwehr Brigade
Brigade Westernhagen (Landwehr and Landsturm)
Total 20 Btle, 7 Esk, 12 Bttrn

On 8 February 1915, Korps Dickhuth (Thorn) as organized as follows:

75th Infantry Brigade
Infantry Regiment 146
Infantry Regiment 150
II Abteilung/Field Artillery Regiment 82
Brigade Griepenkerl
Reserve Infantry Regiment Leinbach
Infantry Regiment Runge (4 Btl)
Festungs MG Abt 6
Festungs MG Abt 14
Ersatz/Ulan Regiment 4
Squadron v. Sprenger
one 9-Cm battery
4th Battery/2d Guard Reserve Foot Artillery Rgt (Heavy Field Howitzers)
1st Landwehr Pioneer Company of the Guard Corps
Detachment Plantier
Field Battalions Reiser & Schwartz
II Battalion/Landwehr Infantry Regiment 38
cavalry foot detachment from the Austro-Hungarian 3rd Cavalry Division
Landsturm Squadron Posen
2nd Battery/Field Artillery Regiment 82
Two Horse Batteries from the Austro-Hungarian 3rd Cavalry Division
½ Landwehr Foot Artillery Battalion Posen II (Heavy Field Howitzers)
8th Battery/Foot Artillery Regiment 11 (15-Cm Cannon)
2nd Ersatz Battery/Foot Artillery Regiment 28 (15-Cm Cannon)
Vistula Flotilla (2 Armored Steamers, 22 Motorboats, 3 Tenders)

The 87th Infantry Division was formed as a square division. The order of battle of the division on 20 August 1915 was as follows:

173. Infanterie-Brigade
Infanterie-Regiment Nr. 345
Infanterie-Regiment Nr. 346
179. Infanterie-Brigade
Infanterie-Regiment Nr. 347
Landsturm-Infanterie-Regiment Nr. 8
Kavallerie-Regiment Nr. 87
Feldartillerie-Regiment Nr. 87
4. Kompanie/Pionier-Bataillon Nr. 26
2. Garde-Landwehr-Pionier-Kompanie

Late-war order of battle

The division underwent a number of organizational changes over the course of the war. It was triangularized in December 1917. Cavalry was reduced, artillery and signals commands were formed, and combat engineer support was expanded to a full pioneer battalion. The order of battle on 24 February 1918 was as follows:

179. Infanterie-Brigade
Infanterie-Regiment Nr. 345
Infanterie-Regiment Nr. 347
Reserve-Ersatz-Infanterie-Regiment Nr. 3
Radfahrer-Kompanie Nr. 156
1.Eskadron/Grenadier-Regiment zu Pferde 3
Artillerie-Kommandeur 3
Feldartillerie-Regiment Nr. 38
Stab Pionier-Bataillon Nr. 87
3. Landwehr-Kompanie/Pionier-Bataillon Nr. 6
2. Ersatz-Kompanie/Pionier-Bataillon Nr. 25
Minenwerfer-Kompanie Nr. 87
Divisions-Nachrichten-Kommandeur 87

References
 87. Infanterie-Division (Chronik 1915/1918) - Der erste Weltkrieg
 Hermann Cron et al., Ruhmeshalle unserer alten Armee (Berlin, 1935)
 Hermann Cron, Geschichte des deutschen Heeres im Weltkriege 1914-1918 (Berlin, 1937)
 Günter Wegner, Stellenbesetzung der deutschen Heere 1825-1939. (Biblio Verlag, Osnabrück, 1993), Bd. 1
 Histories of Two Hundred and Fifty-One Divisions of the German Army which Participated in the War (1914-1918), compiled from records of Intelligence section of the General Staff, American Expeditionary Forces, at General Headquarters, Chaumont, France 1919 (1920)

Notes

Infantry divisions of Germany in World War I
Military units and formations established in 1915
Military units and formations disestablished in 1919
1915 establishments in Germany